is a train station on the Kyoto Municipal Subway Karasuma Line in Minami-ku, Kyoto, Japan.

Lines

  (Station Number: K13)

Layout
The station has one underground island platform with two tracks.

Surrounding area
Nintendo Co., Ltd. headquarters

References

Railway stations in Kyoto Prefecture
Railway stations in Japan opened in 1988